On Beyond Zebra! is a 1955 illustrated children's book by Theodor Geisel, better known as Dr. Seuss. In this take on the genre of alphabet book, Seuss presents, instead of the twenty-six letters of the conventional English alphabet, twenty additional letters that purportedly follow them.

Plot
The young narrator, not content with the confines of the ordinary alphabet, reports on additional letters beyond Z, with a fantastic creature corresponding to each new letter. For example, the letter "FLOOB" is the first letter in Floob-Boober-Bab-Boober-Bubs, which have large buoyant heads and float serenely in the water.

In order, the letters, followed by the creatures for which the letters are the first letter when spelling their names, are YUZZ (Yuzz-a-ma-Tuzz), WUM (Wumbus), UM (Umbus), HUMPF (Humpf-Humpf-a-Dumpfer), FUDDLE (Miss Fuddle-dee-Duddle), GLIKK (Glikker), NUH (Nutches), SNEE (Sneedle), QUAN (Quandary), THNAD (Thnadners), SPAZZ (Spazzim), FLOOB (Floob-Boober-Bab-Boober-Bubs), ZATZ (Zatz-it), JOGG (Jogg-oons), FLUNN (Flunnel), ITCH (Itch-a-pods), YEKK (Yekko), VROO (Vrooms), and HI! (High Gargel-orum).

The book ends with an unnamed letter that is substantially more complicated than those with names. A list of all the additional letters is shown at the end.

Analysis

Judith and Neil Morgan, Geisel's biographers, note that most of the letters resemble elaborate monograms, "perhaps in Old Persian". These letters are not officially encoded in Unicode, but the independent ConScript Unicode Registry provides an unofficial assignment of code points in the Unicode Private Use Area for them.

Legacy
Some of the animals from On Beyond Zebra! appear in the 1975 CBS TV Special The Hoober-Bloob Highway. In this segment, Hoober-Bloob babies don't have to be humans if they don't choose to be, so Mr. Hoober-Bloob shows them a variety of different animals; including ones from On Beyond Zebra! and If I Ran the Zoo (1950). Such animals include: a Jogg-oon, a Sneedle, a Zatz-it, a Wumbus, and a Yekko. The book was infrequently reprinted. Open Library lists American editions in 1955, 1983, and 1999. A British edition was published in 2012.

Withdrawal from publication
On March 2, 2021, Dr. Seuss Enterprises, owner of the rights to Seuss's works, withdrew On Beyond Zebra! and five other books from publication because of imagery they deemed as "hurtful and wrong". The book depicts a character called "Nazzim of Bazzim". Nazzim is "of unspecified nationality". He rides a "Spazzim", a fantasy-creature resembling a camel. The Vancouver Sun described the "problematic imagery" as "probably the least obvious" of the six books removed from publication.

Kyle Smith of the National Review describes Nazzim as "a proud-looking camel-riding Arab nobleman". Smith argues that only someone "hypersensitive" would take offense at this image. Smith notes that the Dr. Seuss books as a whole have been accused of both overrepresenting white people, and of depicting non-white people in a "blithe comical sensibility".

According to an article of the Pittsburgh Post-Gazette, Nazzim is a "vaguely Arab-looking character". According to Dan McLaughlin, the article's author, Nazzim appears on a single page, not the entire book. McLaughlin notes that Dr. Seuss' books have been accused of featuring too few non-white people, but the then-recent decision withdrew from publication the ones which do feature non-white people. He agrees that Nazzim's depiction is a vague stereotype of a foreign culture. He argues, however, that a conception of foreignness is necessary when introducing children to the idea that the world includes people with "different ways of life".

According to an article of Distractify, Nazzim "is a man who appears to be of Middle Eastern descent". The animal which he rides resembles a camel.

References

Sources
 
 
 
 
 

American picture books
Books by Dr. Seuss
1955 children's books
Alphabet books
Random House books
Race-related controversies in literature
Stereotypes of Arab people